The Electio Viritim Monument is located in Warsaw, Wola in the area where Polish Kings were elected during 1575-1764 period in the First Republic of Poland.

Inscription

External links
 http://www.przewodnik.wola.waw.pl/page/2069,pomnik-electio-viritim.html

Monuments and memorials in Warsaw
1997 sculptures
1997 establishments in Poland